German submarine U-324 was a Type VIIC/41 U-boat of Nazi Germany's Kriegsmarine during World War II.

The submarine was laid down on 24 March 1943 at the Flender Werke at Lübeck, launched on 12 February 1944, and commissioned on 5 April 1944 under the command of Oberleutnant zur See Ernst Edelhoff.

Design
Like all Type VIIC/41 U-boats, U-324 had a displacement of  when at the surface and  while submerged.

U-324 was fitted with five  torpedo tubes (four fitted at the bow and one at the stern), fourteen torpedoes, one  SK C/35 naval gun, (220 rounds), one  Flak M42 and two  C/30 anti-aircraft guns. Its complement was between forty-four and sixty.

Service history

U-324 served with the 4th U-boat Flotilla for training, and subsequently with the 11th U-boat Flotilla for front-line service from 15 March to 8 May 1945. Still under repair at the cessation of hostilities, she surrendered at Bergen, Norway on 9 May 1945 and was broken up in March 1947.

See also
 Battle of the Atlantic (1939-1945)

References

Bibliography

External links

German Type VIIC/41 submarines
U-boats commissioned in 1944
World War II submarines of Germany
1944 ships
Ships built in Lübeck